Wilton station is a commuter rail station on the Danbury Branch of the Metro-North Railroad's New Haven Line, located in Wilton, Connecticut. The station first opened in 1852 and is the most used station on the Danbury Branch by weekday passengers.

History

Wilton station opened in 1852 alongside Cannondale station, Georgetown station, and Kent station on the Danbury and Norwalk Railroad. The original station house was replaced in 1939 by the current one. The original station was moved north to the nearby property of Charles Dana in 1941. Following the death of Dana in 1968, the town acquired the Dana property. However, the original station had fallen into advanced disrepair, and after almost being demolished in 1974, the original station house was moved to Lambert Corners in 1978., where it remains today.

On May 21, 2014, both businesses housed inside of the station house closed unexpectedly. During the COVID-19 pandemic, ridership at Wilton station dropped significantly, prompting a decreased frequency of trains stopping at Wilton.

Station layout
The station has one four-car-long high-level Island platform serving trains in both directions. On both the north and south end of the platform, the two tracks merge into a single track.

The station has 212 parking spaces, 105 owned by the state and all managed by the Town of Wilton. The station is owned and operated by the Connecticut Department of Transportation (ConnDOT), but Metro-North is responsible for trash and snow removal as well as platform lighting.

References

Notes

External links

Connecticut Department of Transportation, "Condition Inspection for the Wilton Station" report, September 2002
 Station from Ridgefield Road from Google Maps Street View

Stations along New York, New Haven and Hartford Railroad lines
Metro-North Railroad stations in Connecticut
Buildings and structures in Wilton, Connecticut
Railroad stations in Fairfield County, Connecticut